Babar is an animated television series produced in Canada by Nelvana Limited and The Clifford Ross Company. It premiered in 1989 on CBC and US HBO, and subsequently was rerun on Qubo from its launch 2006 until its closure in 2021. The series is based on Jean de Brunhoff's original Babar books, and was Nelvana's first international co-production. The show has been dubbed in 30 languages in over 150 countries.

The show was the first to be based on the Babar books; previously, two Babar specials narrated by Peter Ustinov were produced by Lee Mendelson and Bill Melendez for NBC: The Story of Babar, the Little Elephant on October 21, 1968, and Babar Comes to America on September 7, 1971.

In 2010, a computer-animated sequel series spin-off of Babar titled Babar and the Adventures of Badou premiered on Disney Junior in the U.S. The new series takes place several years after the original and focuses on a majority of new characters including Badou, Babar's grandson and Pom's son, but only one human character appears on the show.

Plot
Based on the books by Jean de Brunhoff and Laurent de Brunhoff, the plot of the first two seasons focuses on the story of Babar as it is told by him to his children. The past Babar is a young elephant who, traumatized by a hunter slaughtering his mother, flees from his home forest in exile to the city, where a kind Old Lady adopts him and teaches him the ways of human life. He returns to his home forest full of ideas for progress and, following the previous elephant king's death from eating poisonous mushrooms, hatches a plan to drive out the unnamed hunter and his men. For his heroism, Babar is crowned king of the elephants, plans and builds Celesteville, and grows up to become a father himself.

While the first two seasons focus on Babar's recollections of his childhood and early years as king, as well as some two stories told by his children, the series shifts its focus in the third season to Babar's family life in the present day.

Episodes (original series)

Characters

Babar's family
 Babar is the King of Celesteville. As a young elephant, he is forced to watch as his mother is killed by the Hunter during a jungle poaching expedition. He subsequently flees, ending up in Paris, where he is adopted by Madame and learns city ways, such as formal education and clothing. He brings his love of the city back to the great forest and builds the beautiful, happy kingdom of Celesteville for the elephants. He is a dedicated ruler and family man, and a keen world traveler. Due to his childhood experiences, he is extremely protective of his family and kingdom, and often works with other animals in the jungle to ensure the safety of all. However, he is not without a sense of humour, often directed at himself. Most of the episodes of the television show involve his recalling (and retelling) earlier events in his life as a lesson for his or his children's modern predicaments.
 Celeste is Babar's wife and Queen of Celesteville. As Babar's childhood girlfriend, she is portrayed as brave, smart, and spirited. She has also travelled the world and has had many great adventures. As Queen, she has a more regal presence, but she maintains an engaging manner and sense of humour.
 Arthur is Babar's mischief-making brother-in-law. He often gets himself (and Babar's children) involved with practical jokes and stunts. Although the English and French versions of the official characters page lists him as a cousin, this goes against the canon of the show where he is clearly referred to as Celeste's brother, Babar's brother-in-law, and the uncle of Babar and Celeste's children. The Japanese version also refers to him as Celeste's younger brother. In addition, neither Celeste nor Arthur is ever referred to as a cousin of Babar in the show. In the book, "The Story of Babar", Celeste and Arthur are shown to have two different mothers and we are told they are Babar's cousin and little cousin, respectively. Arthur is prominent in childhood flashbacks in the first two seasons, but his later appearances as an adult are sporadic as he is frequently at sea.
 Pom is the oldest of the children and their informal leader, as well as the heir apparent to Babar. He is protective of his brother and sisters though he will gladly join in with Alexander in playfully teasing his sisters Flora and Isabelle.
 Flora is the second child and older daughter, is portrayed as smart, brave, and strong-willed, much like her mother as a child.
 Alexander is the third child and younger son, he is the goofiest and generally the most fun-loving of the children. Frequently enlisting his siblings in various schemes, he is often disarmingly naive about the commotion he causes.
 Isabelle: The youngest of the four children. She begins to walk and talk at an early age. Isabelle starts as a baby in the series but eventually develops into a toddler.
 Babar's mother is a female elephant who was shot and killed by the Hunter in the first episode of the show (Babar's First Step), setting the course for much of the rest of the series. Her murder, which Babar witnessed, was a great source of trauma for her son, and influences much of the direction of Babar's life. She was Pom, Alexander, Flora and Isabelle's grandmother and Badou's great-grandmother.

Babar's close friends and royal court
 Madame (The Old Lady) is a human who adopted Babar when he ran away from the hunter who killed his mother. From their first meeting in the city, the Old Lady and Babar shared a special friendship. She gave him a home and taught him about life in the city. Though she missed him greatly, she understood his decision to return to the forest. Babar built her a home in Celesteville, where she now lives with her elephant friends. Little is known about her personal life, although Babar at one point meets her former lover when he appears as a reclusive organ-player in The Phantom.
 Zephir is a monkey who is one of Babar's oldest friends, and is considered one of the family. He is the first to take off with Arthur and the kids on some crazy adventure, but Babar knows that Zephir can always be trusted to look after the children and bring them home safely. Zephir runs the local malt shop and is seen doing various other jobs in Celesteville.
 Cornelius is Babar's longtime chief advisor, arguably the wisest elephant in Celesteville. He was present at Babar's birth and has been by his side for most of Babar's life, often acting not just as an advisor and confidant but something of a father figure to the king. Although showing his age (notably through a tendency to fall asleep while at work), he remains sharp and incisive, and is invariably Babar's most trusted counsellor, always accompanying Babar on diplomatic visits or working alongside Babar as he governs the kingdom. While more level-headed than Pompadour, Cornelius is occasionally carried away by his colleague's panics. His catchphrase is "My tusks!"
 Pompadour is another advisor to Babar, Pompadour acts as finance minister as well as the minister of royal protocol, to which he strongly adheres, sometimes creating unnecessary bureaucracy for the kingdom. A high-strung elephant, he often opposes radical ideas and is easily alarmed.
 Troubadour is Pompadour's assistant, a smaller elephant who does not speak but is very dedicated to helping Babar and his family. He is prominent in the earlier seasons.
 Chef Truffles is the palace cook, dedicated but often easily upset by various situations in the palace which concern food preparation. Something of a stereotype of temperamental French chefs, Truffles speaks with a prominent French accent.
 The Old King is the late King of the Elephants who died after eating poisonous mushrooms. He appears in Babar's First Step, and appears to adult Babar as a vision in Ghost for a Day. 
 Other animals sometimes appear as friends or allies of Babar. They include the tortoise king Tuttle and his wife, who play a prominent role in Babar's Triumph and King Tuttle's Vote; a weepy "way-out" bird and a music-loving crocodile who both appear in The Gift, pirate crocodiles (led by Captain Sanga) in The Coin, and others of varying species.

Rataxes' family
 Lord Rataxes is the king of Rhinoland. Rataxes is typically depicted as a rude, cold-hearted and often power-hungry leader. Although he only appears once in the books, he serves as Babar's main antagonist in the TV series in various episodes. Rataxes often dreams of dominating the jungle and even claiming the elephant kingdom for himself, but his schemes to advance those goals generally fall apart or are easily thwarted by the elephants. As Rataxes himself admits, his resentment of Babar is rooted in jealousy of Babar's comparative popularity and the success of the elephant kingdom; Babar, for his part, tends to regard Rataxes mainly as an annoyance, but is not unsympathetic to him. Because Rataxes' dislike of Babar is rooted more in this resentment than any personal grudge, he often helps Babar and friends as an antihero; many of the episodes end with Rataxes listening to reason and accepting Babar's point of view as long as he and/or Rhinoland can benefit. Rataxes does have some positive qualities, including his fierce devotion to his family and rhinoceros subjects; his forceful leadership is also helpful when various crises threaten the jungle. He appears to remain the same age both in the present and in Babar's stories from the past, as do his wife and advisor Basil.
 Lady Rataxes is Rataxes' wife. She is portrayed as generally calmer and more clear-thinking than her husband, and on friendlier terms with the elephants, but her occasional flights of fancy (such as urging a return to the traditional "rhino rampage" or desiring some luxury good or service) can prompt Rataxes into scheming against the elephants in order to fulfil her wishes. Her real name is Louise, but she is normally called Lady Rataxes.
 Victor is Rataxes' son, also on friendly terms with the elephants; he is particularly close to Babar's children Alexander, Flora, and Pom, and often appears as their playmate. He worships his father, but like Lady Rataxes and Basil, he shows some awareness of Rataxes' limitations.
 Basil is Rataxes' chief advisor; he is highly capable, competent, and organized. Like Lady Rataxes and Victor, he is on friendly terms with the elephants, although Rataxes' various schemes occasionally force Basil into antagonizing them. Serving as a chief administrator of Rhinoland, Basil handles most of the paperwork, coordinates all of the kingdom's day-to-day governance, all while serving as Rataxes' travel agent, spy, and de facto butler. He is also a self-proclaimed fitness expert, an advocate of clean living, and a skillful theatre director. He is extremely loyal and humble to Rataxes but knows that at times Rataxes' urges must be managed carefully. He is also not above subtly poking fun at his employer from time to time.

Villains
 The Hunter was the primary antagonist for the first four of the five episodes of the series. Introduced in "Babar's First Steps", the Hunter is shown stalking Babar's herd of elephants in the jungle shortly before he shoots and kills Babar's mother. Dressed in a classic colonial-era Africa outfit and sporting a fu manchu moustache, the Hunter is portrayed as a particularly malevolent human, who refuses to reason with the animals and sees them solely as a means to enrich himself. Babar has had nightmares of the Hunter killing his mother in "City Ways", and generally understands the Hunter to be his worst foe. When Babar returns to the forest in "Babar Returns", he finds the Hunter and a group of poachers have managed to capture all the elephants. Babar, with the help of Celeste and Arthur, manages to free them, and with Babar's car the group pushes the Hunter off a cliff and into the river. The Hunter returns in force in "Babar Triumphs" with more poachers and an SUV equipped with a plow. The Hunter and his group are successful in capturing Lord Rataxes and the Rhinos, and get dangerously close to the newly constructed Celesteville. While Babar focuses on rescuing Rataxes and the rhinos, the Hunter spreads crude oil throughout the forest in order to start a massive forest fire, which will flush the animals out. Teaming up together, all of the animals successfully fight the fire until the wind changes direction, taking the fire to the Hunter's encampment. The remaining poachers flee, leaving the Hunter screaming in fury before he is engulfed in the flames.
 Mademoiselle Soretoza is an antagonist that appeared in "The Show Must Go On". An ostrich and award-winning ballerina dancer who comes to perform in Celesteville, she proves to be a temperamental prima donna, and spends much of her time belittling the elephant ballet company and crew working with her. After it appears the show will not go forward when she refuses to perform, Babar confronts her, leading to her quitting the show and being replaced with Celeste (and Lord Rataxes as the leading man).
 The Cheetah Team are the antagonists that appeared in "Tour de Celesteville". The unnamed Cheetahs and bike racers are dastardly and disfitful and had plans to cheat Babar, Arthur, Rataxes and Basil to get to the Tour de Celesteville Annual Bike race, they had a late entry and stopped nothing to win and plans to use it as a spittoon. When the race begins, The Cheetahs set traps for the Elephant Team, the Rhino Team and other racers, to get to the finish line to win the Celesteville cup. When Babar and Rataxes overtakes them to win the Celesteville cup, they crashed in the tree, and when Arthur and Basil defeats them, they won the first place and the Celesteville cup. The Cheetahs smashed their two-seated bike and blaming each other for losing them in second place in the race, but the unnamed moles uses the bike and boulder to roll them, killing them for good.

Cast 
 Gordon Pinsent as King Babar
 Dawn Greenhalgh as Queen Celeste
 Lea-Helen Weir as Flora #2 (1990–1991)
 Stuart Stone as Young Arthur (1989) / Alexander #2 (1990–1991)
 Lisa Yamanaka as Flora #1 (1989) / Isabelle (1990–1991)
 Jeff Pustil as Zephir
 Paul Haddad as Uncle Arthur
 Stephen Ouimette as Pompadour
 Elizabeth Hanna as Madame
 Allen Stewart-Coates as Lord Rataxes
 Corrine Koslo as Lady Rataxes
 John Stocker as Basil
 Chris Wiggins as Cornelius
 Noah Godfrey as Victor (1990–1991)
 Benjamin Barrett as Pom (1990–1991)
 Gavin Magrath as Young Babar (1989)
 Tara Charendoff as Young Celeste (1989)
 Bobby Becken as Pom (1989)
 Amos Crawley as Alexander #1 (1989)
 Dan Hennessey as Chef Truffles

Telecast and home media
The series was first premiered in 1989 on CBC in Canada and HBO in the U.S., and subsequently was rerun on Qubo from January 14, 2007 until its closure on February 28, 2021. The show has been dubbed in 30 languages in over 150 countries.

DVD releases
In Region 2, Fremantle Home Entertainment released a three-single disc collections on DVD in the United Kingdom on May 4, 2009.

In June 2012, Entertainment One released the complete first season on DVD in Region 1 for the very first time.

Critical reception
David Knox at TV Tonight commented on the subject of death and the way it is depicted in Children's Television, citing the pilot of Babar as an example: "This week ABC replayed the pilot episode of the animated series in which the baby elephant loses his mother to a hunter after being shot by a rifle. Produced by a Canadian company in 1989 it doesn't shy away from the separation of mother and child, as written in the original Babar the Elephant stories". An ABC spokesperson told TV Tonight that ABC had carefully considered the content which aired at 3:30 p.m. EST on ABC2 for a G-rated audience, ABC in Australia (2 July 1990 - 3 June 2012): "At no point in the sequence was there any depiction of blood or wounds, and the depiction of the rifle being used was very careful and discreet. The simple animation style reduced the level of detail of the rifle and the action. While there was a sense of threat and menace associated with the hunter and his use of violence, having regard to the animation style, the level of visual detail, and the stylized manner in which the action was depicted, Audience and Consumer Affairs considers that this sense of threat and menace was very low. The violence in the sequence was very discreetly implied, and was not gratuitous as it was a pivotal, dramatic moment of great significance to the story".

Charles Solomon of Los Angeles Times gave a review of Babar's first few episodes: "The designs for the characters and the simple animation capture the essence of Jean de Brunhoff's understated watercolor illustrations. The artists occasionally seem to lose their sense of the characters' size and weight: the young Babar jumps and climbs in ways that seem very unelephantlike (but very few elephants wear uniforms and crowns, as the adult Babar does). As the voice of Babar, Gordon Pinsent gives the elephant king a reassuring presence and keeps the mildly didactic stories from bogging down in moralizing. Child actors provide the voices for the young Babar and his friends, which makes the show sound a lot like a "Peanuts" special at times. Created by the Canadian Nelvana studio - the producers of the entertaining My Pet Monster - "Babar" manages to be endearing without sliding into the saccharine cutesiness of Hello Kitty. Parents with children in the 4-to-10-year-old range should plan on setting their VCRs: The kids will probably want to watch Babar more than once".

Common Sense Media finds the series suitable for viewers aged 4 and up and has given the series 4 stars out of 5, writing that Babar is a good role model who promotes sharing and getting along with others.  They continued to say that Parents Need to Know that "although the show is an ideal pick for preschoolers, most kids will probably outgrow it by the time they're 7". The review ended by saying: "Many shows adapted from books tend to move at a slow pace. But Babar provides enough adventure and silliness to keep even the most active preschooler engaged. As an extra plus, the music is beautifully orchestrated. Babar exemplifies the lesson that all of us are the same on the inside. These elephants hold their trunks high, but they also know that money doesn't conquer all. Many kids' shows depict well-off characters as villainous and/or gluttonous; Babar shows kids that wealth doesn't necessarily equate to greed".

Awards
In 1990, the TV series won a 7 d'Or award for Best Youth Program (Meilleure émission pour la jeunesse). In 1989, the TV series won a Gemini award for Best Animated Program or Series (Patrick Loubert, Lenora Hume, Clive A. Smith, and Michael Hirsh). In 1990, the show won a Gemini for Best Animated Program or Series (Patrick Loubert, Michael Hirsh, and Clive A. Smith). It was also nominated for a Gemini award for Best Original Music Score for a Series (Milan Kymlicka). In 1992, the TV series won a Gemini award for Best Animated Program or Series (Clive A. Smith, Patrick Loubert, and Michael Hirsh).

Films

Babar: The Movie
In the year of 1989, US distributor New Line Cinema joined forces with two Canadian companies Nelvana and Astral Films to make a film adaption of Babar. This would be followed by a sequel released in 1999, titled Babar: King of the Elephants, and was released by Alliance Films theatrically and HBO Home Video as a direct-to-video film.

Babar and Father Christmas
The 1986 television film Babar and Father Christmas won the 1987 Gemini award for Best Animated Program or Series. It first aired on HBO in the U.S. on December 5, 1986, on the CBC in Canada on December 15, on the BBC in the United Kingdom on Christmas Eve 1986 and on the ABC in Australia on Christmas Day 1987. The film's DVD title is also known as Babar et le Père Noël in France. The film was made in Canada. The song "Christmas in Celesteville" was featured in the TV film. Gary Morton wrote the music and Merilyn Read wrote the lyrics. John Brough, Geri Childs, Teresa Dunn, and Craig Kennedy are credited as singers.

2000 series

There was a short-lived revival (known as Season 6 as the final season) of the animated series in 2000 on Teletoon and KiKa. Nelvana Limited returned to produce this series, alongside Ellipseanime and the Kodansha company. Most of the episodes for the revival series have Babar and his family traveling in a hot-air balloon to different Lands of Adventure, such as the Land of Toys. None of the cast from the previous series returned for the revival, though Dan Lett would go on to voice adult Pom in Babar and the Adventures of Badou.

Episodes (2000 series)

Cast
 Dan Lett as Babar
 Janet-Laine Green as Celeste
 Kyle Fairlie as Alexander
 Kristen Bone as Flora
 Noah Reid as Pom
 Philip Williams as Zephir

See also

 List of French animated television series
 List of French television series
 List of Babar episodes

References

External links

 
 Babar Movie cast

1980s Canadian animated television series
1990s Canadian animated television series
1980s Canadian children's television series
1990s Canadian children's television series
1989 Canadian television series debuts
1991 Canadian television series endings
1980s preschool education television series
1990s preschool education television series
Animated preschool education television series
Canadian children's animated television series
Canadian children's animated adventure television series
Canadian preschool education television series
CBC Television original programming
Canadian television shows based on children's books
Animated television series about children
Animated television series about elephants
Treehouse TV original programming
YTV (Canadian TV channel) original programming
English-language television shows
French television shows based on children's books
Television series by Nelvana
Television shows set in Paris
Television shows set in France
HBO original programming
Babar the Elephant